Diane Pershing (born May 27, 1943) is an American voice actress. She began her singing career as a back-up singer for Johnny Mathis and went on to appear in the show group, The Establishment, on tour and on TV. She also voiced Poison Ivy in the DC Animated Universe.

Early years
Pershing has a Bachelor of Arts degree from UCLA.

Career
As a writer, she has written for TV (The Love Boat, What's Happening Now), 19 romance novels, published film reviews for various small newspapers and Rotten Tomatoes, and is a member of Romance Writers of American and Mystery Writers of America and The Authors' Guild.

As a voice actress, she is perhaps most well known for providing the voice of the villainess Poison Ivy on Batman: The Animated Series and its subsequent spin-offs. She has also lent her voice to series such as Inspector Gadget, Darkwing Duck, The New Adventures of Flash Gordon, The Centurions (as Crystal Kane), Dungeons & Dragons, She-Ra: Princess of Power and The Smurfs.

Filmography

Film

Television

Video games

References

External links

 
 
 SBV Talent Agency Profile

Living people
American television writers
American video game actresses
American voice actresses
American women novelists
American women television writers
20th-century American actresses
21st-century American actresses
20th-century American novelists
21st-century American novelists
20th-century American women writers
21st-century American women writers
1943 births